Zabereznik is a rural locality (a village) in Tiginskoye Rural Settlement, Vozhegodsky District, Vologda Oblast, Russia. The population was 39 as of 2002.

Geography 
Zabereznik is located 50 km northwest of Vozhega (the district's administrative centre) by road. Pesok is the nearest rural locality.

References 

Rural localities in Vozhegodsky District